The Men's 100 metres T12 event for the 2012 Summer Paralympics took place at the London Olympic Stadium on 3 and 4 September.

Records
Prior to the competition, the existing World and Paralympic records were as follows.

Results

Round 1
Run 3 September 2012 from 11:41. Qual. rule: winner of each heat (Q) plus best second place (q) qualified.

Heat 1

Heat 2

Heat 3

Final
Run 4 September 2012 at 19:25.

 
Q = qualified by place. q = qualified by time. RR = regional record. PB = personal best. SB = seasonal best. DQ = disqualified.

References

Athletics at the 2012 Summer Paralympics
2012 in men's athletics